

References

Scenic Byways
Indiana